Myron Bradford Kreidler (born September 28, 1943) is an American physician and politician serving his sixth term as the eighth Washington Insurance Commissioner. A member of the Democratic Party, he previously served one term in the Congress, representing Washington's 9th congressional district.

Education and early career
Kreidler holds a bachelor's degree and a doctor of optometry from Pacific University in Forest Grove, Oregon. After his US Army service as an optometry officer, he earned a master of public health degree in health administration from the UCLA School of Public Health.

He was employed as an optometrist by Group Health Cooperative of the Puget Sound in the Olympia clinic for twenty years. In 1973, he won a seat on the North Thurston School Board. He also served in the Washington State Legislature for 16 years.

Political career
Kreidler served 16 years in the Washington Legislature. He was in the Washington House of Representatives from 1976 to 1984 and then the Washington State Senate from 1984 to 1992. He was defeated by Republican Randy Tate in 1994.

Following his re-election defeat to Congress in 1994, he was appointed to the Northwest Power Planning Council in 1995 by Washington Governor Mike Lowry and subsequently re-appointed by Governor Gary Locke. He served on the NWPPC until 1998 when he was appointed Regional Director for the United States Department of Health and Human Services's Region 10 office in Seattle, Washington, serving in that post until 2000, when he resigned in order to seek election to the office of Washington State Insurance Commissioner.

Kreidler is Washington's eighth insurance commissioner. He was first elected as insurance commissioner in 2000. He was re-elected to a sixth term in 2020.

He retired as a lieutenant colonel from the Army Reserves with 20 years of service.

Health care 
Kreidler has focused on health reform most of his career and worked to implement the Affordable Care Act in Washington state. He was the first insurance commissioner to reject President Obama's proposal to give insurers another year to sell pre-Affordable Care Act plans and testified before Congress on the law's impact on Washington state.

He has opposed efforts by the Trump administration to dismantle the Affordable Care Act, including coverage for pre-existing conditions and limiting the sale of short-term medical plans.

Surprise billing
In 2019, Kreidler proposed legislation banning the practice of surprise medical billing. After several extreme cases were highlighted in the news, support for his proposal increased and the bill was signed into law later that year.

Health care sharing ministries
Kreidler has taken action against fake health sharing ministries and in 2019, he fined one company and its affiliate more than $1 million for selling sham health sharing ministry memberships in Washington state to thousands of consumers.

Climate change
Since 2007, Kreidler has chaired the National Association of Insurance Commissioners' Climate Change and Global Warming Work Group. He led a successful push for insurers to disclose if and how they are preparing for the potential risks associated with climate change.

Controversies 
 The Seattle Times editorialized that Kreidler was "slow to stand up for the tens of thousands of families struggling to get necessary care for loved ones with mental illness. Astoundingly, his office has not taken a single enforcement action on the law, and a proposed rule to strengthen enforcement has languished in his office for two years."  It took class-action attorneys to win a judgment at the Washington Supreme Court for those with autism being denied care by insurers, with no help from Kreidler.
 Taxpayers paid a $450,000 settlement to whistleblower after State Auditor Troy Kelley refused to investigate her complaint against a Kreidler chief deputy—there was no discipline for the chief deputy.
 Taxpayers paid $50,000 settlement, following a $20,000 investigation, after a Kreidler chief deputy allegedly harassed a worker who was forced to borrow sick leave from co-workers while the chief deputy enjoyed two months of paid leave before finally being dismissed.
 Kreidler had a chief deputy quit following a 2013 hallway argument over a plant Kreidler wanted to accept as a gift from a special interest.  Most executive staff followed.
 In June 2017 the 73-year-old regulator was rocked by news that Washington's health insurers were increasing rates for 2018 by an average of over 22 percent.  Kreidler had, just days before his 2016 re-election, dismissed 2017 increases averaging 13.6% as "a one-time adjustment."  A July 2017 Seattle Times article described Kreidler as "sympathetic to insurers" despite their huge surpluses.

Personal life
Kreidler resides in Lacey, Washington with his wife, Lela. They have three grown children and three grandchildren. He is a member of several professional and fraternal organizations. He retired from the United States Army Reserve as a Lieutenant Colonel, after serving on active duty as an optometrist during the Vietnam and first Persian Gulf wars.

References

External links

 Washington State Office of the Insurance Commissioner

|-

|-

1943 births
Washington (state) Insurance Commissioners
American optometrists
Democratic Party members of the United States House of Representatives from Washington (state)
Living people
Democratic Party members of the Washington House of Representatives
Pacific University alumni
People from Lacey, Washington
School board members in Washington (state)
UCLA School of Public Health alumni
United States Army reservists
United States Department of Health and Human Services officials
Democratic Party Washington (state) state senators